George Zambelli, Sr. (October 19, 1924 – December 25, 2003) was an American fireworks entertainer, and long-time president and manager of Zambelli Fireworks, one of the oldest fireworks companies in the United States.

Zambelli died being treated for flu symptoms relating to a long battle with cancer at West Penn Hospital in Pittsburgh, Pennsylvania.

References

2003 deaths
1924 births